Edmonton-Glenora is a provincial electoral district for the Legislative Assembly of Alberta, Canada. It is located north of the North Saskatchewan River in Edmonton.

The electoral district, as defined by the Electoral Divisions Act, 2003, encompasses an area that includes, in addition to the neighbourhood of Glenora, the neighbourhoods of Britannia Youngstown, Canora, Grovenor, High Park, Inglewood, Mayfield, McQueen, North Glenora, Westmount and Woodcroft as well.

History
The electoral district was created in the 1971 boundary redistribution primarily out of the old Edmonton West district.

The 2010 boundary redistribution saw the riding significantly change boundaries on its northern and western sides. The northern boundary was shifted from 118 Avenue to Yellowhead Trail in land that was part of Edmonton-Calder. The western boundary which previously ran along 170 Street now runs north east along Mayfield Road to 111 Ave and then runs North on 149 Street ceding a large portion of land to Edmonton-Meadowlark.

Boundary history

Representation history

The electoral district was created in the 1971 boundary redistribution from the old riding of Edmonton West. That electoral district first elected a Social Credit MLA when it was created in 1963 and elected Progressive Conservative candidate Lou Hyndman to his first term in 1967.

The first election held in 1971 in the district saw Hyndman run for his second term in office. He would win a near landslide taking almost 60% of the popular vote in a very high turnout that hasn't been equaled since with over 80% of electors coming out to vote. His party would form government and Hyndman would be appointed to cabinet in the government of Peter Lougheed.

Hyndman would win his third term in office with the highest percentage of popular vote in his career in the 1975 election. He would defeat future NDP MLA Alex McEachern taking almost 75% of the popular vote. Hyndman would go on to serve two more terms in office. He would keep his cabinet post in the final year of his fifth term when Premier Don Getty came to power and retired from office at dissolution of the assembly in 1986.

The second representative for the riding was Progressive Conservative Nancy MacBeth who won her first election in 1986 with just over half the popular vote. She would be appointed to cabinet in her first term under Premier Don Getty and serve in cabinet until 1992. MacBeth ran for a second term in 1989 and won a second term with a slightly reduced majority. She decided to run for leadership of the Progressive Conservative party in 1992. She waged a tough battle against Ralph Klein but was defeated. Macbeth did not return to cabinet when Klein came to power and did not run for re-election in 1993.

The Alberta Liberal party surged on a wave of support in Edmonton in the 1993 general election that saw the party sweep every seat. Glenora  chose Liberal candidate Howard Sapers as the third MLA for the riding. He would be re-elected to a second term with a reduced majority in 1997 and defeated on a bid for his third term in 2001.

Drew Hutton became the first candidate in the riding to knock out a sitting incumbent. He won office in the 2001 election under the Progressive Conservative banner. Hutton only lasted a term in office before losing his seat back to the Liberals in 2004.

The 2004 election was an electoral anomaly. Liberal candidate Bruce Miller won the district despite his party losing 9 points from the last election. Incumbent Drew Hutton finished a distant third while NDP candidate Larry Booi who surged into second place with a record level of support under the NDP banner.

Miller was defeated in the 2008 election despite gaining popular support since being elected in 2004. He was defeated by Progressive Conservative candidate Heather Klimchuck who benefited from the collapse of the NDP vote to surge past Miller. After being elected Klimchuck was appointed to cabinet by Premier Ed Stelmach in 2008.

Legislature results

1971 general election

1975 general election

1979 general election

1982 general election

1986 general election

1989 general election

1993 general election

1997 general election

2001 general election

2004 general election

2008 general election

2012 general election

2015 general election

2019 general election

Senate nominee results

2004 Senate nominee election district results

Voters had the option of selecting 4 Candidates on the Ballot

2012 Senate nominee election district results

Student Vote results

2004 student election

On November 19, 2004 a Student Vote was conducted at participating Alberta schools to parallel the 2004 Alberta general election results. The vote was designed to educate students and simulate the electoral process for persons who have not yet reached the legal majority. The vote was conducted in 80 of the 83 provincial electoral districts with students voting for actual election candidates. Schools with a large student body that reside in another electoral district had the option to vote for candidates outside of the electoral district then where they were physically located.

References

External links 
The Legislative Assembly of Alberta
Map of Edmonton Glenora

Alberta provincial electoral districts
Politics of Edmonton